Whole Washington is a statewide universal healthcare advocacy organization in Washington state that advocates for universal single-payer healthcare for Washington and the United States of America. Whole Washington is a 501(c)(4) organization and has campaigns for statewide single payer healthcare in Washington via both the state legislature and statewide ballot initiative. It is also a supporter of single payer at the federal level through Medicare for All as introduced into the US Congress by Pramila Jayapal in the House of Representatives and Bernie Sanders in the Senate.

History 
Whole Washington was founded in 2017 in order to run a ballot measure campaign to legally establish a universal single payer healthcare plan for Washington state. In 2018 Erin Georgen filed a ballot initiative to the people (I-1600) to establish a statewide single payer healthcare plan called the Whole Washington Health Trust. The campaign was entirely volunteer run and collected over 200,000 signatures which was short of the necessary number to put the initiative on the ballot. In 2021 Senator Bob Hasegawa (WA-11) introduced a legislative version of the initiative into the Washington Senate as SB-5204 where it currently has seven co-sponsors. The bill has never been given a hearing, vote, or been introduced into the Washington House of Representatives. In 2021 Whole Washington ran an updated version of I-1600 as an initiative to the legislature (I-1362) but the campaign was suspended in August 2021 due to public health concerns during the spike of the Delta variant of COVID-19. Whole Washington is running a new initiative campaign for 2022 in hopes of getting on the 2023 ballot.

Structure 
Whole Washington is a 501(c)(4) nonprofit organization which lobbies at the local, state, and federal levels of government on healthcare issues, especially the advocacy of single payer healthcare. The board of directors includes retired state senator Maralyn Chase.

Policy proposal 
Whole Washington has since 2017 run multiple ballot initiatives and had multiple bills introduced into the Washington state legislature. While there have been variations between those policy proposals, they have all been different versions of statewide single payer healthcare for Washington state in which a public nonprofit insurance plan (called the Washington Health Trust in the latest version of the policy proposal) would be established by the Washington state government that all residents of the state would be eligible for. The plan's coverage includes dental, hearing, vision, reproductive care and other healthcare services not covered by traditional Medicare.

Polling 
In 2017, Northwest Progressive Institute (NPI) commissioned and released a poll of 887 likely Washington state voters via landline conducted by Public Policy Polling. The poll results showed 64 percent of those polled supported expanding Medicare to provide universal health coverage to all Americans—with 50 percent strongly supporting it and 14 percent somewhat supporting it. The 32 percent that opposed the initiative was broken down into 9 percent somewhat opposed and 23 percent strongly opposed. Of those polled, 4 percent were undecided or not sure.

Selected Endorsements 
Whole Washington's proposal The Washington Health Trust has been endorsed by a combination of grassroots organizations, former and current legislators, city councils, and county and LD organizations within the state Democratic party. Some of the endorsers include:
 Marko Liias - a Washington State Senator
 Kshama Sawant - a member of the Seattle City Council
 Aberdeen City Council
 Liz Berry (politician) - a Representative in the Washington House of Representatives

See also 
 Single-payer healthcare
 Universal health care
 Physicians for a National Health Program
 Healthcare-NOW!
 National Nurses United

References

External links 
 Official website
 Whole Washington on Twitter
  Washington Universal Healthcare Coverage Initiative (#1362)  on Ballotpedia

2017 establishments in Washington (state)
Healthcare reform advocacy groups in the United States
Non-profit organizations based in Washington (state)
Organizations established in 2017
501(c)(4) nonprofit organizations